Pyongyang is the capital and largest city of North Korea, where it is known as the "Capital of the Revolution". According to the 2008 population census, it has a population of 3,255,288. Pyongyang is a directly administered city with a status equal to that of the North Korean provinces.

Pyongyang is one of the oldest cities in Korea. It was the capital of two ancient Korean kingdoms, Gojoseon and Goguryeo, and served as the secondary capital of Goryeo. Much of the city was destroyed during the First Sino-Japanese War, but it was revived under Japanese rule and became an industrial center. Following the establishment of North Korea in 1948, Pyongyang became its de facto capital. The city was again devastated during the Korean War, but was quickly rebuilt after the war with Soviet assistance.

Pyongyang is the political, industrial and transport center of North Korea. It is home to North Korea's major government institutions, as well as the ruling Workers' Party of Korea which has its headquarters in the Forbidden City.

Names

The city's other historic names include Ryugyong, Kisong, Hwangsong, Rakrang, Sŏgyong, Sodo, Hogyong, Changan, and Heijō (during Japanese rule in Korea). There are several variants. During the early 20th century, Pyongyang came to be known among missionaries as being the "Jerusalem of the East", due to its historical status as a stronghold of Christianity, namely Protestantism, especially during the Pyongyang Revival of 1907.

After Kim Il-sung's death in 1994, some members of Kim Jong-il's faction proposed changing the name of Pyongyang to "Kim Il-sung City", but others suggested that North Korea should begin calling Seoul "Kim Il-sung City" instead and grant Pyongyang the moniker "Kim Jong-il City".  In the end, neither proposal was implemented.

Prehistory
In 1955, archaeologists excavated evidence of prehistoric dwellings in a large ancient village in the Pyongyang area, called Kŭmtan-ni, dating to the Jeulmun and Mumun pottery periods. North Koreans associate Pyongyang with the mythological city of "Asadal", or Wanggeom-seong, the first second millennium BC capital of Gojoseon ("Old Joseon") according to Korean historiographies beginning with the 13th-century Samgungnyusa.

Historians deny this claim because earlier Chinese historiographical works such as the Guanzi, Classic of Mountains and Seas, Records of the Grand Historian, and Records of the Three Kingdoms, mention a much later "Joseon". The connection between the two therefore may have been asserted by North Korea for the use of propaganda. Nevertheless, Pyongyang became a major city in old Joseon.

History

Pyongyang was founded in 1122 BC on the site of the capital of the legendary king Dangun. Wanggeom-seong, which was in the location of Pyongyang, became the capital of Gojoseon from 194 to 108 BC. It fell in the Han conquest of Gojoseon in 108 BC. Emperor Wu of Han ordered four commanderies be set up, with Lelang Commandery in the center and its capital established as "Joseon" (朝鮮縣, 조선현) at the location of Pyongyang. Several archaeological findings from the later, Eastern Han (20–220 AD) period in the Pyeongyang area seems to suggest that Han forces later launched brief incursions around these parts.

The area around the city was called Nanglang during the early Three Kingdoms period. As the capital of Nanglang, Pyeongyang remained an important commercial and cultural outpost after the Lelang Commandery was destroyed by an expanding Goguryeo in 313.

Goguryeo moved its capital there in 427. According to Christopher Beckwith, Pyongyang is the Sino-Korean reading of the name they gave it in their language: Piarna, or "level land".

In 668, Pyongyang became the capital of the Protectorate General to Pacify the East established by the Tang dynasty of China. However, by 676, it was taken by Silla, but left on the border between Silla and Balhae. Pyongyang was left abandoned during the Later Silla period, until it was recovered by Wang Geon and decreed as the Western Capital of Goryeo. During the Joseon period, it became the provincial capital of Pyeongan Province.

During the Japanese invasions of Korea (1592–98), Pyongyang was captured by the Japanese and held until they were defeated in the Siege of Pyongyang. Later in the 17th century, it became temporarily occupied during the Qing invasion of Joseon until peace arrangements were made between Korea and Qing China. While the invasions made Koreans suspicious of foreigners, the influence of Christianity began to grow after the country opened itself up to foreigners in the 16th century. Pyongyang became the base of Christian expansion in Korea. By 1880 it had more than 100 churches and more Protestant missionaries than any other Asian city, and was called "the Jerusalem of the East".

In 1890, the city had 40,000 inhabitants. It was the site of the Battle of Pyongyang during the First Sino-Japanese War, which led to the destruction and depopulation of much of the city. It was the provincial capital of South Pyeongan Province beginning in 1896. Under Japanese colonial rule, the city became an industrial center, called Heijō (with the same Chinese characters  but read as ) in Japanese.

In July 1931, the city experienced anti-Chinese riots as a result of the Wanpaoshan Incident and the sensationalized media reports about it which appeared in Imperial Japanese and Korean newspapers.

By 1938, Pyongyang had a population of 235,000.

After 1945 

On 25 August 1945, the Soviet 25th Army entered Pyongyang and it became the temporary capital of the Provisional People's Committee for North Korea. A People's Committee was already established there, led by veteran Christian nationalist Cho Man-sik. Pyongyang became the de facto capital of North Korea upon its establishment in 1948. At the time, the Pyongyang government aimed to recapture Korea's official capital, Seoul. Pyongyang was again severely damaged in the Korean War, during which it was briefly occupied by South Korean forces from 19 October to 6 December 1950. The city saw many refugees evacuate when advancing Chinese forces pushed southward towards Pyongyang. UN forces oversaw the evacuation of refugees as they retreated from Pyongyang in December 1950. In 1952, it was the target of the largest aerial raid of the entire war, involving 1,400 UN aircraft.

Already during the war, plans were made to reconstruct the city. On 27 July 1953 – the day the armistice between North Korea and South Korea was signed – The Pyongyang Review wrote: "While streets were in flames, an exhibition showing the general plan of restoration of Pyongyang was held at the Moranbong Underground Theater", the air raid shelter of the government under Moranbong. "On the way of victory... fireworks which streamed high into the night sky of the capital in a gun salute briefly illuminated the construction plan of the city which would rise soon with a new look". After the war, the city was quickly rebuilt with assistance from the Soviet Union, and many buildings were built in the style of Stalinist architecture. The plans for the modern city of Pyongyang were first displayed for public viewing in a theatre building. Kim Jung-hee, one of the founding members of the Korean Architects Alliance, who had studied architecture in prewar Japan, was appointed by Kim Il Sung to design the city's master plan. Moscow Architectural Institute designed the "Pyongyang City Reconstruction and Construction Comprehensive Plan" in 1951, and it was officially adopted in 1953. The transformation into a modern, propaganda-designed city featuring Stalin-style architecture with a Korean-style arrangement (and other modernist architecture that was said to have been greatly influenced by Brazilian architect Oscar Niemeyer) began. The 1972 Constitution officially declared Pyongyang the capital.

In 2001, North Korean authorities began a long-term modernisation programme. The Ministry of Capital City Construction Development was included in the Cabinet in that year. In 2006, Kim Jong-il's brother-in-law Jang Song-thaek took charge of the ministry.

Throughout the rule of Kim Jong-un a number of residential projects were constructed. In 2013 and 2014 residential projects dedicated to scientists were completed in Unha Scientists Street and Wisong Scientists Street while in 2015 work took place on a residential project in Mirae Scientists Street. In 2017, in dedication to the 105th birthday of the founder and first leader, Kim Il-sung, 3,000 units were built in the new Ryomyong Street complex. The second decade of the 2000s saw the construction of residential projects in Saesalim Street near the Taedonggang Brewing Company in Sadong District (2021), in Taephyong, and in the Pothong Riverside Terraced Residential District located at the city center next to the Pothong River on land previously used by the headquarters of the International Taekwon-Do Federation. Kim Jong-un ordered that the residential district be renamed "Kyongru-dong" meaning “beautiful bead terrace”. From the 50s to the 70s the area was the location of the residence of Kim Il-sung and was known as “Mansion No. 5”. Other recent public building projects include the Mansudae People’s Theater opened in 2012, the Munsu Water Park opened in 2013, and the renovated and expanded Sunan International Airport and Pyongyang Sci-Tech Complex, both completed in 2015, the Samjiyon Orchestra Theater, which was fitted out of the domed Korean People's Army Circus built in 1964, and the Pyongyang General Hospital, of which construction started in 2020. Additional re-development projects occurred in the area around the Arch of Triumph where the Pyongyang People’s Hospital no. 1 was demolished. Apartment blocks in the area of Inhŭng-dong, in Moranbong-guyok district and in the area of Sinwon-dong in Potonggang-guyok were demolished in 2018-2019 for the construction of new apartment buildings. Also in 2018 the Youth Park Open-Air Theatre in Sungri Street, used to host political rallies, was rebuilt. In 2021-2022 a major housing project was executed along Hwasong Street in Hwasong-guyok district in northern Pyongyang with high-rises. In 2023 phase two of construction of housing in Hwasong-guyok was launched, on the former territory of the Pyongyang Vegetable Science Institute. In addition, a complex of greenhouse farm and housing was initiated on the former territory of Kangdong Airfield which was demolished in 2019.

Pyongyang, alongside Seoul, launched a bid to host the 2032 Summer Olympics, but failed to make the joint city candidate list.

Geography
The Taedong River flows southwestward through the city toward the Korea Bay. The Pyongyang plain, where the city is situated, is one of the two large plains on the Western coast of the Korean peninsula, the other being the Chaeryong plain. Both have an area of approximately 500 square kilometers.

Climate
Pyongyang has a hot-summer humid continental climate (Köppen: Dwa), featuring warm to hot, humid summers and cold, dry winters. Cold, dry winds can blow from Siberia in winter, making conditions very cold; the low temperature is usually below freezing between November and early March, although the average daytime high is at least a few degrees above freezing in every month except January. The winter is generally much drier than summer, with snow falling for 37 days on average.

The transition from the cold, dry winter to the warm, wet summer occurs rather quickly between April and early May, and there is a similarly abrupt return to winter conditions in late October and November.

Politics

Major government and other public offices are located in Pyongyang, which is constitutionally designated as the country's capital. The seat of the Workers' Party Central Committee and the Pyongyang People's Committee are located in Haebangsan-dong, Chung-guyok. The Cabinet of North Korea is located in Jongro-dong, Chung-guyok.

Pyongyang is also the seat of all major North Korean security institutions. The largest of them, the Ministry of People's Security, has 130,000 employees working in 12 bureaus. These oversee activities including: police services, security of party officials, classified documents, census, civil registrations, large-scale public construction, traffic control, fire safety, civil defence, public health and customs. Another significant structure based in the city is the State Security Department, whose 30,000 personnel manage intelligence, political prison systems, military industrial security and entry and exit management.

The politics and management of the city is dominated by the Workers' Party of Korea, as they are in the national level. The city is managed by the Pyongyang Party Committee of the Workers' Party of Korea and its chairman is the de facto mayor. The supreme standing state organ is the Pyongyang People's Committee, responsible
for everyday events in support of the city. This includes following local Party guidance as channeled through the Pyongyang Party Committee, the distribution of resources prioritised to Pyongyang, and providing support to KWP and internal security agency personnel and families.

Administrative status and divisions
P'yŏngyang is divided into 19 wards (ku- or guyŏk) (the city proper), 2 counties (kun or gun), and 1 neighborhood (dong).

 Chung-guyok
 Pyongchon-guyok
 Potonggang-guyok
 Moranbong-guyok
 Sŏsŏng-guyŏk
 Songyo-guyok
 Tongdaewŏn-guyŏk
 Taedonggang-guyŏk 
 Sadong-guyŏk
 Taesong-guyok
 Mangyongdae-guyok
 Hyongjesan-guyok
 Hwasong-guyok
 Ryongsong-guyok
 Samsok-guyok
 Ryokpo-guyok
 Rakrang-guyok
 Sunan-guyŏk
 Unjong-guyok
 Kangdong County 
 Kangnam County
 Banghyun Dong

Foreign media reports in 2010 stated that Kangnam-gun, Chunghwa-gun, Sangwŏn-gun, and Sŭngho-guyŏk had been transferred to the administration of neighboring North Hwanghae province. However, Kangnam-gun was returned to Pyongyang in 2011.

Banghyun Dong, a missile base, was administrated by Kusong, North Pyongan Province. It had been transferred to the administration of P'yŏngyang on February 10, 2018.

Cityscape

After being destroyed during the Korean War, Pyongyang was entirely rebuilt according to Kim Il-sung's vision, which was to create a capital that would boost morale in the post-war years. The result was a city with wide, tree-lined boulevards and public buildings with terraced landscaping, mosaics and decorated ceilings. Its Russian-style architecture makes it reminiscent of a Siberian city during winter snowfall, although edifices of traditional Korean design somewhat soften this perception. In summer, it is notable for its rivers, willow trees, flowers and parkland.

The streets are laid out in a north–south, east–west grid, giving the city an orderly appearance. North Korean designers applied the Swedish experience of self-sufficient urban neighbourhoods throughout the entire country, and Pyongyang is no exception. Its inhabitants are mostly divided into administrative units of 5,000 to 6,000 people (dong). These units all have similar sets of amenities including a food store, a barber shop, a tailor, a public bathhouse, a post office, a clinic, a library and others. Many residents occupy high-rise apartment buildings. One of Kim Il-sung's priorities while designing Pyongyang was to limit the population. Authorities maintain a restrictive regime of movement into the city, making it atypical of East Asia as it is silent, uncrowded and spacious.

Structures in Pyongyang are divided into three major architectural categories: monuments, buildings with traditional Korean motifs and high-rises. Some of North Korea's most recognisable landmarks are monuments, like the Juche Tower, the Arch of Triumph and the Mansu Hill Grand Monument. The first of them is a  granite spire symbolizing the Juche ideology. It was completed in 1982 and contains 25,550 granite blocks, one for each day of Kim Il-sung's life up to that point. The most prominent building on Pyongyang's skyline is Ryugyong Hotel, the seventh highest building in the world terms of floor count, the tallest unoccupied building in the world, and one of the tallest hotels in the world. It has yet to open.

Pyongyang has a rapidly evolving skyline, dominated by high-rise apartment buildings. A construction boom began with the Changjon Street Apartment Complex, which was completed in 2012. Construction of the complex began after late leader Kim Jong-il described Changjon Street as "pitiful". Other housing complexes are being upgraded as well, but most are still poorly insulated, and lacking elevators and central heating. An urban renewal program continued under Kim Jong-un's leadership, with the old apartments of the 1970s and '80s replaced by taller high rise buildings and leisure parks like the Kaesong Youth Park, as well as renovations of older buildings. In 2018, the city was described as unrecognizable compared to five years before.

Landmarks

Notable landmarks in the city include:

 the Ryugyong Hotel
 the Kumsusan Palace of the Sun
 the Arch of Triumph (heavily inspired by, but larger than, Paris's Arc de Triomphe)
 the birthplace of Kim Il-sung at Mangyongdae Hill at the city outskirts
 Juche Tower
 two large stadiums:
 Rungrado 1st of May Stadium
 Kim Il-sung Stadium
 the Mansu Hill complex, including the Korean Revolution Museum
 Kim Il-sung Square
 Yanggakdo International Hotel

Pyongyang TV Tower is a minor landmark. Other visitor attractions include the Korea Central Zoo. The Arch of Reunification has a map of a united Korea supported by two concrete Korean women dressed in traditional dress straddling the Reunification Highway, which stretches from Pyongyang to the Korean Demilitarized Zone (DMZ).

Culture

Cuisine

Pyongyang served as the provincial capital of South Pyongan Province until 1946, and Pyongyang cuisine shares the general culinary tradition of the Pyongan province. The most famous local food is Pyongyang raengmyŏn, or also called mul raengmyŏn or just simply raengmyŏn. Raengmyŏn literally means "cold noodles", while the affix mul refers to water because the dish is served in a cold broth. Raengmyŏn consists of thin and chewy buckwheat noodles in a cold meat-broth with dongchimi (watery kimchi) and topped with a slice of sweet Korean pear.

Pyongyang raengmyŏn was originally eaten in homes built with ondol (traditional underfloor heating) during the cold winter, so it is also called "Pyongyang deoldeori" (shivering in Pyongyang). Pyongyang locals sometimes enjoyed it as a haejangguk, which is any type of food eaten as a hangover-cure, usually a warm soup.

Another representative Pyongyang dish, Taedonggang sungeoguk, translates as "flathead grey mullet soup from the Taedong River". The soup features flathead grey mullet (abundant in the Taedong River) along with black peppercorns and salt. Traditionally, it has been served to guests visiting Pyongyang. Therefore, there is a common saying, "How good was the trout soup?", which is used to greet people returning from Pyongyang. Another local specialty, Pyongyang onban (literally "warm rice of Pyongyang") comprises freshly cooked rice topped with sliced mushrooms, chicken, and a couple of bindaetteok (pancakes made from ground mung beans and vegetables).

Social life

In 2018, there were many high quality restaurants in Pyongyang with Korean and international food, and imported alcoholic beverages. Famous restaurants include Okryu-gwan and Ch'ongryugwan. Some street foods exist in Pyongyang, where vendors operate food stalls. Foreign foods like hamburgers, fries, pizza, and coffee are easily found. There is an active nightlife with late-night restaurants and karaoke.

The city has water parks, amusement parks, skating rinks, health clubs, a shooting range, and a dolphinarium.

Sports

Pyongyang has a number of sports clubs, including the April 25 Sports Club and the Pyongyang City Sports Club.

Economy

Pyongyang is North Korea's industrial center. Thanks to the abundance of natural resources like coal, iron and limestone, as well as good land and water transport systems, it was the first industrial city to emerge in North Korea after the Korean War. Light and heavy industries are both present and have developed in parallel. Heavy manufactures include cement, industrial ceramics, munitions and weapons, but mechanical engineering remains the core industry. Light industries in Pyongyang and its vicinity include textiles, footwear and food, among others. Special emphasis is put on the production and supply of fresh produce and subsidiary crops in farms on the city's outskirts. Other crops include rice, sweetcorn and soybeans. Pyongyang aims to achieve self-sufficiency in meat production. High-density facilities raise pigs, chicken and other livestock.

Until the late 2010s Pyongyang still experienced frequent shortages of electricity. To solve this problem, two power stations – Huichon Power Stations 1 and 2 – were built in Chagang Province and supply the city through direct transmission lines. A second phase of the power expansion project was launched in January 2013, consisting of a series of small dams along the Chongchon River. The first two power stations have a maximum generating capacity of 300 megawatts (MW), while the 10 dams to be built under second phase are expected to generate about 120 MW. In addition, the city has several existing or planned thermal power stations. These include Pyongyang TPS with a capacity of 500 MW, East Pyongyang TPS with a capacity of 50 MW, and Kangdong TPS which is under construction.

Retail

Pyongyang is home to several large department stores including the Pothonggang Department Store, Pyongyang Department Store No. 1, Pyongyang Department Store No. 2, Kwangbok Department Store, Ragwon Department Store, Pyongyang Station Department Store, and the Pyongyang Children's Department Store.

The city also has Hwanggumbol Shop, a chain of state-owned convenience stores supplying goods at prices cheaper than those in the jangmadang markets. Hwanggumbol Shops are specifically designed to control North Korea's expanding markets by attracting consumers and guaranteeing the circulation of money in government-operated stores.

Transportation

Pyongyang is also the main transport hub of the country: it has a network of roads, railways and air routes which link it to both foreign and domestic destinations. It is the starting point of inter-regional highways reaching Nampo, Wonsan and Kaesong. Pyongyang railway station serves the main railway lines, including the Pyongui Line and the Pyongbu Line. Regular international rail services to Beijing, the Chinese border city of Dandong and Moscow are also available.

A rail journey to Beijing takes about 25 hours and 25 minutes (K27 from Beijing/K28 from Pyongyang, on Mondays, Wednesdays, Thursdays and Saturdays); a journey to Dandong takes about 6 hours (daily); a journey to Moscow takes six days. The city also connects to the Eurasian Land Bridge via the Trans-Siberian Railway. A high-speed rail link to Wonsan is planned.

The Metro, tram and trolleybus systems are used mainly by commuters as a primary means of urban transportation. Cycle lanes were introduced on main thoroughfares in July 2015. There are relatively few cars in the city. Cars are a symbol of status in the country due to their scarcity as a result of restrictions on import because of international sanctions and domestic regulations. Some roads are also reported to be in poor condition. However, by 2018, Pyongyang had begun to experience traffic jams.

State-owned Air Koryo has scheduled international flights from Pyongyang Sunan International Airport to Beijing (PEK), Shenyang (SHE), Vladivostok (VVO), Shanghai (PVG) and Dandong. The only domestic destinations are Hamhung,
Wonsan, Chongjin, Hyesan and Samjiyon. Since 31 March 2008, Air China launched a regular service between Beijing and Pyongyang, although Air China's flights are often canceled due to lack of passengers.

Education and science
Kim Il-sung University, North Korea's oldest university, was established in 1946. It has 21 faculties, 4 research institutes, and 10 other university units. These include the primary medical education and health personnel training unit, the medical college; a physics faculty which covers a range of studies including theoretical physics, optical science, geophysics and astrophysics; an atomic energy institute and the largest law firm in the country (Ryongnamsan Law Office). Kim Il-sung University also has its own publishing house, sports club (Ryongnamsan Sports Club), revolutionary museum, nature museum, libraries, a gym, indoor swimming pool and educator apartment houses. Its four main buildings were completed in 1965 (Building 1), 1972 (Building 2), and 2017 (Buildings 3 and 4).

Other higher education establishments include Kim Chaek University of Technology, Pyongyang University of Music and Dance and Pyongyang University of Foreign Studies. Pyongyang University of Science and Technology (PUST) is the country's first private university where most of the lecturers are American and courses are carried out in English. A science and technology hall is under construction on Ssuk Islet. Its stated purpose is to contribute to the "informatization of educational resources" by centralizing teaching materials, compulsory literature and experimental data for state-level use in a digital format.

Sosong-guyok hosts a 20 MeV cyclotron called MGC-20. The initial project was approved by the International Atomic Energy Agency (IAEA) in 1983 and funded by the IAEA, the United States and the North Korean government. The cyclotron was ordered from the Soviet Union in 1985 and constructed between 1987 and 1990. It is used for student training, production of medical isotopes for nuclear medicine as well as studies in biology, chemistry and physics.

Health care
A new hospital named Pyongyang General Hospital began construction in Pyongyang in 2020.

Twin towns – sister cities
Pyongyang is twinned with:

 Baghdad, Iraq
 Chiang Mai, Thailand
 Dubai, United Arab Emirates
 Jakarta, Indonesia
 Kathmandu, Nepal
 Moscow, Russia
 Tianjin, China
 Ulaanbaatar, Mongolia

See also

 List of cities in North Korea

Notes

References

Citations

Bibliography
 .

Further reading
Dormels, Rainer. North Korea's Cities: Industrial Facilities, Internal Structures and Typification. Seoul, Jimoondang, 2014. .
 

Kracht, Christian, Eva Munz & Lukas Nikol. The Ministry of Truth: Kim Jong Il's North Korea. Feral House, October 2007. .
Meuser, Philipp, editor. Architectural and Cultural Guide Pyongyang. Berlin, DOM, 2012. .
Springer, Chris. Pyongyang: The Hidden History of the North Korean Capital. Saranda Books, 2003. .

Willoughby, Robert. North Korea: The Bradt Travel Guide. Globe Pequot, 2003. .

External links

 Interactive virtual tour Aerial view of Pyongyang city
 Super High Resolution Image Panoramic view of Pyongyang city

 North Korea Uncovered (North Korea Google Earth), a comprehensive mapping of North Korea, including all of the locations mentioned above, on Google Earth
 Holidays in Pyongyang
 Instagram photos of Pyongyang
 City profile of Pyongyang

Pyongyang at night

 
Capitals in Asia
Directly Governed Cities and Special Administrative Regions of North Korea
Socialist planned cities
12th-century BC establishments